Brickdam Cathedral, more formally known as the Cathedral of Immaculate Conception, is the Roman Catholic cathedral in Georgetown, Guyana, and is the leading Catholic church of the country. Built in the 1920s, it is constructed in a Romanesque architectural style designed by Leonard Stokes, and is 200 feet long and 1,000 feet wide. The centre ceiling is 60 feet 6 inches high, and the dome reaches 74 feet 10 inches.

In 1819 the Catholic Committee (Messrs Fitzgerald, De Ridder, Manget, Milne and Franckland) made a request for the construction of a church at Brickdam on a portion of the old parade ground.

Governor Sir Benjamin D'Urban laid the foundation stone of the first church on 12 December 1825. Initially named Christ Church, it was later renamed circa 1847 the Church of the Resurrection. Small and plainly designed, this church was replaced by the Lady Chapel, built on the southern side of Camp and Hadfield Streets. This chapel was soon dismantled and re-erected at Victoria, where it stood until 1921.

The foundation stone for St. Mary's Chapel was laid in the presence of Governor Sir Francis Hincks on 21 April 1868. The main building was designed by Cesar Castellani and the tower was designed by Fr. Ignatius Scoles. This cathedral (including the sanctuary) was 120 feet long and 75 feet wide. Constructed of greenheart and crabwood, the cathedral was described by Fr. Scoles "as a fine piece of Gothic design as one could expect to meet within Western tropics".

On 7 March 1913 the cathedral was destroyed by fire. On the next Sunday (9 March) Catholic Mayor of Georgetown, Francis Dias, called a meeting where it was decided to raise funds for a new cathedral.

On 15 August 1915 Bishop CT Galton laid the foundation stone of the present cathedral. Construction took 10 years (1921–1931), using reinforced concrete.  Granite stone came from the Dalli and Wolga quarries on the Essequibo River, and the sand came from Leguan Island.

The incomplete cathedral was opened by Bishop Galton on 13 March 1921.

The marble altar was erected in 1930, and is a gift from Pope Pius XI to Bishop Galton.  The marble pulpit is a memorial to the Fogarty family. A metal shrine to the Virgin Mary atop the western facade is a memento of St. Mary's Cathedral. The shrine adorned the pinnacle of the earlier building's steeple, and survived its fall during the 1913 fire.

References
 nationaltrust.gov.gy

External links
 
 Aerial view

Roman Catholic cathedrals in Guyana
Christianity in Georgetown, Guyana
Cathedrals in Guyana
Roman Catholic churches completed in 1921
20th-century Roman Catholic church buildings
Buildings and structures in Georgetown, Guyana